Wiley G. Clarkson (November 28, 1885 - May 5, 1952) was an American architect.

Wiley Gulick Clarkson was born on November 28, 1885, in Corsicana, Texas. He received his architectural training at the School of the Art Institute of Chicago. After practicing for a few years in Corsicana, Clarkson set up shop in 1912 in Fort Worth. He would remain one of the most prominent architects in Cowtown through the 1950s, where his Classical, Gothic, Italianate, and Beaux Arts buildings still stand.

Notable Fort Worth buildings include:

Texas Christian University Library
 Trinity Episcopal Church
Sanger Brothers Department Store
 Young Men's Christian Association Building
 Woolworth Building
 First Methodist Church
 W.I. Cook Memorial Children's Hospital
 Collins Art Company
Fort Worth Masonic Temple
 Hancock Paint Store
North Side Senior High School
 Shelton Building (McCrory's Variety Store)
Sinclair Building
 Tarrant County Building and Loan Association Building
 W.C. Stripling Department Store
 Municipal Airport Administration Building
United States Courthouse
 Fort Worth Art Center (Modern Art Museum of Fort Worth)

References

1885 births
1952 deaths
Architects from Texas